Quảng Lâm is a commune (xã) and village of the Mường Nhé District of Điện Biên Province, northwestern Vietnam.

The Quảng Lâm language, an Austroasiatic language, is spoken in the commune.

Communes of Điện Biên province
Populated places in Điện Biên province